The 2011 Monterrey Open was a tennis tournament played on outdoor hard courts. It was the third edition of the Monterrey Open and was categorized as an International tournament on the 2011 WTA Tour. It took place at the Sierra Madre Tennis Club in Monterrey, Mexico, from February 28 through March 6, 2011.

Entrants

Seeds

Rankings and seedings are as of February 21, 2011.
Seeding are subject to change.

Other entrants
The following players received wildcards into the main draw:
 Ximena Hermoso
 Anastasia Pavlyuchenkova
 Aravane Rezaï

The following players received entry via qualifying:

 Eleni Daniilidou
 Lucie Hradecká
 Laura Pous Tió
 Aleksandra Wozniak

Champions

Singles

 Anastasia Pavlyuchenkova def.  Jelena Janković, 2–6, 6–2, 6–3
It was Pavlyuchenkova's 1st title of the year and 3rd of her career. She defended her title.

Doubles

 Iveta Benešová /  Barbora Záhlavová-Strýcová def.  Anna-Lena Grönefeld /  Vania King, 6–7(8), 6–2, [10–6]

External links
Official website

Monterrey Open
Monterrey Open
2011 in Mexican tennis